Zhongshan Road (also called 6th Blvd.), named after Sun Yat-sen, is a major arterial in Taipei, Taiwan connecting the Zhongzheng District in the south with the Datong, Shilin Districts and the Beitou District in the north. The road was built in Japanese rule period. It was called Chokushi kaidō (Chokushi Avenue), which was the road leading to Taiwan Grand Shrine. Zhongshan is notable as the commuting route of former ROC president Chiang Kai-shek between the Presidential Building and his Shilin District residence.  Throughout the route, it is divided into express and local lanes, with landscaped medians in between.  Notable landmarks located along Zhongshan Roads includes:

 Chiang Kai-shek Memorial Hall
 Former Kuomintang Headquarters
 National Taiwan University Hospital
 Taipei Main Station
 Executive Yuan
 Judicial Yuan
 Mackay Memorial Hospital
 Taipei Fine Arts Museum
 Grand Hotel
 Shilin Night Market
 Shilin Official Residence
 Tianmu

Zhongshan Road is divided into north and south sections, with the north section lying between Zhongxiao Road and northern Beitou (dead-end), and the south section between Aiguo Road and Roosevelt Road.  There are seven sections in the northern part and only one section in the southern part.

Over the past years, Taipei City has been replacing the Zhongshan Bridge crossing Keelung River to improve traffic flow at the Beian Road/Xinsheng Expressway interchange.  The bridge replacement project was completed in early 2007.

Major Intersections

Zhongshan South Road 
 Roosevelt Road, Aiguo Road
 Ketagalan Boulevard, Renai Road (3rd Blvd), Xinyi Road (2nd Blvd)

Zhongshan North Road 
 Zhongxiao Road (4th Blvd)
 Civic Blvd Expressway (5th Blvd)
 Changan Road (6th Blvd)
 Nanjing Road (7th Blvd)
 Minsheng Road (8th Blvd)
 Minquan Road (9th Blvd)
 Minzu Road (10th Blvd)
 Beian Road/Xinsheng Expressway
 Jiantan Road (Jiantan MRT Station)
 Zhongzheng Road
 Zhongcheng Road
 Dexing Road
 Tianmu Road

See also
 List of roads in Taiwan

See also
Zhongshan Road

Streets in Taipei